The  Hochgern is a mountain found in the Bavarian district of Traunstein, in Germany. It is part of the Chiemgau Alps and has a height of 1748 meters above sea level. The Hochgern marks the junction of the municipalities of Unterwössen, Marquartstein and Ruhpolding, as well as the Urschlau Forest district.

Geographie 
The Hochgern, rising south of the Chiemsee, is a significant member of the Bavarian Alps. With a prominence of 967 meters, the peak is among the most important of the Chiemgau Alps. Several somewhat lower mountains cluster about its centrally-located summit.

References

Mountains of the Alps
Mountains of Bavaria
Chiemgau Alps
One-thousanders of Germany